The Pontiac Bonneville is an automobile built by Pontiac from 1957 until 2005. Bonnevilles were full-sized, with the exception of a brief period of mid-size between 1982 and 1986. The brand was introduced as a limited production performance convertible during the 1957 model year.

The name was taken from the Bonneville Salt Flats in Utah, the site of much early auto racing and most of the world's land speed record runs, which was named in turn after U.S. Army officer Benjamin Bonneville.

Luxury Trim Package and Concept Car 

The Bonneville name first appeared in 1954 on a pair of bubble-topped GM Motorama concept cars called the Bonneville Special, sharing an appearance with the Chevrolet Corvette. It was also the beginning of a new tradition of Pontiac vehicles using French words for model names.

It entered the production lineup as a high-performance, fuel-injected luxury convertible version of the Star Chief in 1957, and was loaded with every available option as standard equipment to include leather upholstery, power adjustable front seat, power windows, power steering, power brakes and power convertible top with the exception of air conditioning and a fashionable for the time continental kit.

Standard only for the Bonneville was Pontiac's first-ever fuel injection system. A mechanical system built by Rochester, it was similar in principle, but not identical, to the contemporary Chevrolet Bel Air installed with the Rochester Ramjet  continuous mechanical fuel injection (closed-loop). Contemporary road tests suggest that it was actually somewhat inferior to the Tri-Power engines, although it did have better fuel economy.

This put the Bonneville in a Cadillac-like price range of US$5,782 ($ in  dollars ) - more than double the base price of the Chieftain on which it was built, with the result being a fully equipped Bonneville could cost more than the longer, entry-level Cadillac Series 62. Only 630 units were produced that first year, all of them fuel-injected, making it one of the most collectible Pontiacs of all time and was introduced to compete with the Chrysler 300C. The following year it became a separate model, and it would endure until 2005 as the division's top-of-the-line model.

First generation (1958) 

The Bonneville became a separate model in 1958, available as a two-door hardtop or a convertible. It paced the Indianapolis 500 in its first year. As a separate model, Bonneville had a significantly lower price tag of $3,586 ($ in  dollars ) for the convertible, thanks to the removal of most of the luxury items found on the 1957 Star Chief bodystyle from standard equipment to the option list. Also a   V8, marketed as a "370", with four-barrel carburetor and dual exhausts was now standard equipment.

The fuel-injection system continued to be offered with the standard engine on the 1957 Star Chief bodystyle was now listed as an extra cost option but very few 1958 Bonnevilles were so equipped due to a towering option price tag of US$500 ($ in  dollars ), which was not considered a very good value considering that for US$93.50, a more reliable Tri-Power option was available with three Rochester two-barrel carburetors and similar power. The Tri-Power produces a claimed , while the fuel injected version was rated at  @ 4800 rpm and  @ 3,000 rpm on 10.5:1 compression.

The retail price dropped from the previous year to US$3,481  ($ in  dollars ) for the coupe, adding leather interior and a power operated convertible top. The fuel-injected engine became an option on any Pontiac model. Only about 400 were produced before the fuel injection system was quietly dropped and fuel injection would not be offered on the Bonneville until 1987 with the Eighth Generation.

For 1958, GM was promoting their fiftieth year of production, and introduced Anniversary models for each brand; Cadillac, Buick, Oldsmobile, Pontiac, and Chevrolet. The 1958 models shared a common appearance on the top models for each brand; Cadillac Eldorado Seville, Buick Limited Riviera, Oldsmobile Starfire 98, Pontiac Bonneville Catalina, and the all-new Chevrolet Bel-Air Impala. 1958 was also the year the "Silver Streak" styling feature was no longer offered, which was first used in 1933. It was also the last year of Harley Earls tenure as department head of GM's  "Art and Colour Section".

Second generation (1959–1960) 

In its third year, the 1959 Bonneville became the senior series with the addition of the four-door hardtop sedan and Safari station wagon body styles, while the Pontiac Catalina became the junior series. At the bottom of the rear quarters, a "skeg"—a downward fin—jutted outboard to counterbalance the rearward point of the quarter panel.

The latter was not just ad copy, either, as Pontiac pushed its wheels further out toward the fenders than anyone else and created what were considered to be the best-cornering full-size cars in the industry. Both the grille design and the Wide Track phrase remained part of Pontiac's image up to its termination. A "Safe-T-Track" differential, used to minimize wheel spin, was an option beginning in 1959. As the platform expanded to add sedans and the Safari station wagons, they were also used as a basis for various specialty cars such as hearses.

Third generation (1961–1964) 

The Bonneville was Pontiac's senior model throughout the 1960s and was instrumental in pushing Pontiac to third place in sales from 1962 to 1970.

The distinctive protruding grille made its appearance on all Pontiac products during the early 1960s, and was a modern revival of a similar appearance on Pontiac products during the 1930s and early 1940s, as demonstrated on the Pontiac Torpedo.

The Bonneville differed from its lesser Catalina and Star Chief counterparts by featuring more luxurious interior trim with upgraded cloth and "Morrokide" vinyl or expanded "Morrokide" upholstery in sedans and coupes, expanded "Morrokide" in Safari wagons and genuine leather seating in convertibles. Bonnevilles (with the exception of Bonneville Safari station wagons) were also (along with Star Chiefs) built on a longer wheelbase version of GM's B-Body. The 1962 hardtop coupe had a listed retail price of $3,349 ($ in  dollars ).

In 1962, the Bonneville coupe was offered along with the all new Pontiac Grand Prix which has the same luxurious interior of the Bonneville on the shorter Catalina wheelbase, and the Grand Prix was slightly more expensive and exclusive.

For a luxurious appearance, the Bonneville came with instrument panels and door panels with walnut veneer trim, carpeted lower door panels, grab bar on the passenger side of the dash and courtesy lights and a rear arm rest. Beginning in 1964, a Bonneville Brougham option package was available that included an even more luxurious interior trim level with front and rear seats featuring center armrests, upgraded door panels and a standard Cordova (vinyl) roof with "Brougham" nameplates. The two-door hardtop was marketed as the "Sports Coupe", the four door pillarless models were called "Vistas".

Bonneville models were standard equipped with Hydra-Matic (through 1964) or Turbo Hydra-Matic (1965-on) automatic transmissions. Options included power steering and power brakes as well as air conditioning. Other popular options included power windows, power seats, radio, cruise control, and 8-lug aluminum wheels that included integral brake drums for improved stopping power.

Fourth generation (1965–1970) 

In 1965 B-Body Pontiacs received a dramatic restyle, featuring fastback rooflines on coupes, rakish fender lines, and even more pronounced "Coke Bottle" styling. Bonnevilles followed largely the same styling cues as on other 1965 Pontiacs, but was 8 inches longer thanks to its new 124-inch wheelbase chassis. The interior featured new instrumentation and dashboard styling as well as new upholstery. This series Bonneville retained the longer wheelbase over the Grand Prix but the hardtop coupe was priced lower at $3,288 ($ in  dollars ) and was not offered the center console included in the Grand Prix. This generation also introduced fender skirts over the rear wheels for a upscale look, shared with Cadillac, Buick and Oldsmobile senior models.

A  engine was an optional upgrade. Both engines had choices of Tri-Power multi-carburetion setups and higher compression ratios.

New for Pontiacs in 1965 was GM's Turbo-Hydramatic 400 transmission, which was released the year prior. This new 3-speed unit had a torque converter, unlike the old fluid-coupling based Super-Hydramatic featured on past Bonneville models. The new transmission also changed the shift pattern from "P-N-D-S-L-R" to a safer and ultimately more modern "P-R-N-D-S-L."

In 1965 Pontiac Motor Division received the Motor Trend "Car of the Year" award. As part of this award, Motor Trend reviewed GTO, Grand Prix, Catalina 2+2 and Bonneville.

In 1966, Bonneville featured a minor update, with new front and rear sheet metal, trim and bright work. The interior saw some updates, including a more squared-up dashboard and minor changes in instrumentation. Powertrain components were the same as 1965.

Bonneville for 1967 received a major update over the previous years. Styling was changed dramatically and featured a new grille-in-bumper front design, more creases to accentuate the "Coke bottle" styling and an updated rear fascia. The interior featured a new wrap around style dash with new switchgear, instrumentation and trim. As per the up-and-coming US Title 49 legislation, 67' Bonnevilles were equipped with seatbelts as standard, as well as other government mandated safety equipment.

1967 also saw a large power-train and chassis refresh for Pontiac. The 389 cubic inch plant was replaced with  one, and the 421 cubic inch plant was replaced with a  one. As per GM's internal edict, the multi-carburation setups found on earlier cars were replaced with the new Quadra Jet "spread bore" carburetor. Carter AFB carburetors were still standard, but the Quadra Jet was featured as the new "High performance" upgrade. A myriad of horsepower ratings were optional. A dual-circuit master cylinder was standard as per legislation and disc brakes became an optional extra.

1968 also saw a large styling update for Bonneville. The front fascia was heavily revised with new side-by-side headlights, however, the side and rear styling stayed largely the same from 1967. The interior saw some minor updates to styling with less chrome, as well as an available 8-Track Tape player.

Power was upgraded to 340 horsepower on the base 400 CI engine, up from 333 on the 1967 model year, the 428 CI engine remained an option

In 1969 the rest of Bonneville's styling was updated. The front fascia stayed similar to 68', however, the rest of the car saw a restyle. The creases on the side were removed and the overall "Coke Bottle" effect was lessened. The rear end saw widened taillights and a color coded bumper insert.  The interior saw even more updates, featuring more padding, wood trim and a slanted dashboard.

Power trains were upgraded to a standard 360 hp 428 CI engine.

1970 saw the most dramatic update to styling for Bonneville, featuring an entirely new front fascia, with more square features and an updated vertical twin grille design. Wrap around amber turn signals were integrated into the lower bumper. Side body lines remained similar to the 69' model year, however the rear design was completely revised with lowered tail lights and bumper, with a design more similar to that of 65' and 66' model years than those directly prior.

The interior was similar to the 1969 model year, retaining the slanted design and minimal chrome trim.

A new  V8 was made standard for the 1970 model year, with the 400 CI engine being an option.

Fifth generation (1971–1976) 

For 1971, the Bonneville was downgraded in the model hierarchy, as a new top line Grand Ville series was introduced. In effect, it replaced the discontinued Executive above the lower-priced Catalina. The Bonneville had new "Monocoque" styling and was offered in three body styles, a pillared four-door sedan, four-door hardtop sedan and two-door hardtop coupe. The standard engine for 1971-72 was a 455 cubic-inch V8 with two-barrel carburetor that was rated at 280 gross horsepower for 1971 and 185 net horsepower for 1972 and optionally available was the four-barrel version of the 455 rated at 325 gross horsepower in 1971 and 250 net horsepower in 1972. The on-paper power ratings reflect the change in power measurement undertaken by the industry for 1972. 1971 was also the first year for Pontiac and other GM divisions to reduce compression ratios on all engines across the board to operate on lower-octane regular leaded, low-lead or unleaded gasoline, reflecting a corporate edict anticipating the introduction of catalytic converters in 1975 to help meet increasingly stringent federal (and California) emission requirements.

In mid-1971, a Turbo-Hydramatic transmission, power steering and power front-disc brakes became standard equipment on Bonneville and other full-sized Pontiacs (as well as other full-sized GM cars).

From 1973 to 1976, the Bonneville's standard engine dropped to a 170-horsepower 400 cubic-inch V8. In 1973, Bonneville was the only full-sized Pontiac to offer a "Radial Tuned Suspension" option package which included the steel-belted radial tires along with an upgraded suspension with Pliacell shock absorbers and front and rear sway bars. The RTS option was expanded for 1974 to all full-sized Pontiacs and radial-ply tires became standard on all 1975 models though an upgraded "RTS" package was still available as an option.

1975 saw the end of the pillarless two-door hardtop model, replaced by a coupe with frameless door glass but with a thick "B" pillar and fixed rear "opera" window. The 1975 model year introduced rectangular headlights - its frontal appearance was similar to the Cadillac DeVilles and Fleetwoods of the same era.

With the demise of the Grand Ville series after 1975, Bonneville once again became the top-line full-sized Pontiac series, with a Bonneville Brougham model featuring the luxurious interior appointments from the departed Grand Ville.

Adjustable pedals were optional in 1976, the last year the Bonneville was offered as a pillarless 4-door hardtop; all subsequent Bonnevilles would have a thick B-pillar and metal-framed door glass.

Size comparison between 1974 and 1984 full-size Pontiac sedans

Sixth generation (1977–1981) 

Bonneville would continue its flagship duties on the downsized big car line that was introduced for 1977. Bonnevilles (and Catalinas) were  shorter in length, over four inches (102 mm) narrower and 800 pounds lighter compared to their 1976 counterparts, but had increased headroom, rear seat legroom and trunk space, and much-improved fuel economy – a major selling point in the years following the 1973-74 energy crisis.

Only a pillared four-door sedan and two-door coupe (with optional opera windows) were offered as the hardtop sedans and coupes offered in previous years were discontinued across the board at all GM divisions. The Bonneville also regained the Safari station wagon as part of its model lineup for the first time since 1970 with woodgrained exterior trim and interior appointments shared with Bonneville coupes and sedans. The Safari was available in both 6 and 9-passenger configurations and featured a dual-action tailgate that could be opened to the side as a door or downward as a tailgate, rather than the disappearing clamshell tailgates found in 1971-76 full-sized Pontiac wagons.

For 1980, all GM B-bodies received revised styling and aerodynamic improvements along with reduced weight.

A 185-horsepower Oldsmobile 403 cubic inch V8 was also an option. In later years, increasingly stringent fuel-economy standards mandated by the Corporate Average Fuel Economy (CAFE) regulations would lead to the discontinuation of the larger engines with a 231 cubic-inch Buick V6 becoming the standard engine on Bonneville coupes and sedans for 1980 and 1981 with the only optional V8s offered including 265 and 301 cubic-inch Pontiac-built gasoline engines or an Oldsmobile-built 350 cid diesel powerplant.

The Bonneville and Catalina, already the smallest-selling of GM's B-body line, suffered a serious drop in demand following the economic recession that began in the spring of 1979. With that, GM decided to pull the plug at the end of the 1981 model year. Along with them went the 301 engine, marking the end of Pontiac V8s. From now on, the division would use Chevrolet engines.

Seventh generation (1982–1986) 

The Bonneville nameplate didn't go anywhere following the discontinuation of full-sized Pontiacs and instead was simply swapped onto the midsized LeMans, which also suffered from poor sales. Thus, GM planners reasoned that attaching a more well-known model name to it would spark demand. This model had been produced since 1978 along with its siblings the Chevrolet Malibu, Oldsmobile Cutlass, and Buick Century, and sported a Buick 231 cid V6, Chevrolet 305 cid V8, or Oldsmobile 350 cid diesel V8. (A Buick 4.1 liter V6 was available in 1982.) The 1982-1986 models were officially known as the Pontiac Bonneville Model G (built on the GM "G" platform), although later models were not badged as such. Styling was revised to bear a closer resemblance to the departed B-body Bonneville and coupes were dropped. GM also began marketing the Bonneville in Canada for the first time starting in 1984 (1982 and 1983 Canadian models carried the Grand LeMans name), as GM's full-size Bonnevilles in Canada were referred to as Parisienne.

While the previous LeMans, on which the new Bonneville was based, was classified as an A-Body, introduction of GM's new front wheel drive A-bodies (e.g. Pontiac 6000) in 1982 prompted the change to "Model G" on these RWD cars. 1983 was the last year for the G-body station wagon as the Pontiac 6000's wagon replaced it. The Bonneville sedan continued in base, Limited Edition (LE), and Brougham versions through 1986. The 1982-1986 Bonnevilles are direct descendants of the 1964 Pontiac Tempest. These 1982-1986 Bonnevilles were the smallest and the last of the old breed of Bonnevilles, having rear wheel drive, full perimeter frame (body on frame), and old-fashioned American car ride and styling.

However, some Pontiac customers did not take to the "downsized" Bonneville as a portion of new-car buyers were switching their preferences from compact and mid-sized cars back to full-sized, V8-powered cars thanks to improving gasoline prices. Late in the 1983 model year, Pontiac reintroduced a full-sized car to the American market by bringing over the Canadian-built Pontiac Parisienne (which was essentially a restyled Chevrolet Caprice and powered by Chevrolet V6 or V8 engines). The Bonneville was then again one notch below the top of the line from late 1983 through 1986.

However, exactly as before, a downsizing proved its salvation. In 1987, the Parisienne was discontinued and the Bonneville was completely redesigned as a front-wheel drive car, rejoining its pre-1982 platform mates: the Buick LeSabre and Oldsmobile Delta 88 and it regained its status as the senior Pontiac.

Eighth generation (1987–1991) 

For 1987, Pontiac migrated the Bonneville from the rear-drive G-body with a V8 to the GM's one year old front-drive H Body platform, shared with the Buick LeSabre and Oldsmobile 88. Initially, a  3.8 L V6 was the sole engine, mated to a four-speed Hydramatic 4T60 automatic — in base and LE trim levels. The base model was only used for 1987. For LE models, an SSE sport package was also available featuring a quicker gear ratio, sportier suspension and more standard features, marketed as having a more sporty, European character than the LeSabre and 88.

For model year (MY) 1988, Pontiac replaced the LG3 engine with a revised version of the same engine, with an increase of 10 hp and 10 ft⋅lbf (14 N⋅m) of torque — the 3.8 engine now used a regular production code (RPO) LN3 and was now called the 3800 V6. Other models on the H-body platform were fitted with the LN3 engine one year later, in 1989. The LN3 was used through 1991, since the Bonneville was redesigned for the 1992 model year.

Also in 1988, the LE model, which was previously the top trim level for 1987, becomes the base trim. The base model, which was used for 1987, was dropped. Additionally, two new models are introducedL: the midlevel SE, which went from an option package to a trim level, and the SSE trim. The SE and SSE trims were then available with many more comfort and convenience options standard such as: electronic climate control, a digital compass, Driver Information Center, 8-way (14-way for the SSE according to GM material) power leather seats, heated power mirrors, CD player with the premium sound package and many more.

The SSE features an extra deep rear valence, a spoiler, lower body cladding, a digital compass/trip computer, an eight speaker premium sound system and much more. One notable feature of the SSE was the addition of an automatic leveling rear air suspension, which also included an inflator in the trunk. The SSE trim was exclusively equipped with an exterior sport appearance package that included body cladding, assorted ground effects, a body color grille and removal of the Bonneville door badges and Pontiac trunk badge, and replacing the Bonneville trunk badge with an SSE Bonneville badge.

For 1989, a compact disc player and remote keyless entry became optional. For 1990 models, a facelift was introduced for the Bonneville, with revisions to the grille, headlights, and taillights, which included amber rear turn signal indicators. For the 1991 model year, Pontiac made suspension revisions. 1991 was also the last year for the first front-wheel-drive generation of the Bonneville.

Ninth generation (1992–1999) 

Unveiled on February 8, 1991, at the 1991 Chicago International Auto Show and launched in July 1991 for the 1992 model year, the interior and exterior of the car were completely redesigned. Developed over a -year period from 1986 to early 1991 under program director Dave Mitchell, styling work took place from 1987 to 1988, with a final design by John Folden being chosen in 1988 and frozen for production that same year. The first prototypes were built in 1989 and went into testing in mid-1989. In August 1990, production preparation began, with early production "builds" being constructed during late 1990. The first series production models were assembled in May 1991, with SE variants being launched in July 1991.

The trims were redone once again, the LE trim (which had standard six-passenger seating) was removed, the SE was now the base model (the only model to offer six-passenger seating as an option), the SSE was now the mid grade and a new top of the line trim was now added, the SSEi, which received a standard passenger-side airbag. According to GM's Pontiac division, these trim acronyms have no implied meaning.

The base and midlevel models were provided with GM's naturally-aspirated 3.8-liter V6, while the SSEi received the supercharged version. All engines came paired with a 4-speed overdrive automatic transmission. SSEi models got dual airbags and antilock brakes. SE and SSE models made due with a driver-side airbag and optional ABS. This generation hosted quite a few Bonneville firsts, becoming quicker and considerably safer. One of the most notable improvements over the previous generation was that the Bonneville SE now came standard with a driver airbag and was the first General Motors product equipped with a passenger airbag, while ABS was available as part of the sport appearance package. The SSE models came with standard ABS and traction control.

The newly revised N/A L27, for the 1992 model year only, was not equipped with an EGR Valve, and can be distinguished by its white intake manifold, as opposed to black from 1993 and on.
Abridged safety options list:

For 1993, the Sport Luxury Edition (SLE RPO: H4U) was offered. This is essentially an SE sub-trim with more standard features such as leather seats, electronic climate control, automatic headlights, premium sound, and "crosslace" alloy wheels, though certain items such as electronic climate control and premium sound could be deleted from an SLE equipped car. This option package designation remained only on the RPO sticker until 1998, when SLE badges were added to the exterior of the vehicle. This continued onto the '99 model year. Many more standard options were available with the SSE. The SSEi came standard with most of the available options in the lower models, including the supercharged 3800 (RPO: L67).

Also, this year introduced the new five-spoke "Torque Star" wheels. A resonator also became standard on the exhaust to lower the raspy tone that the engine produces. Passenger airbags also became standard on all models. However, the former SSEi has been relegated to a new SSEi Supercharger Package. Newly optional for the '94 SSE models equipped with traction control is GM's Computer Command Ride suspension. It was designed specifically to reduce body lean and pitch and it automatically adjusts the suspension from soft to firm when cornering, accelerating, or stopping.

For 1995, the car retained the same appearance, but the SE and SSE trims received a new naturally aspirated engine, the Series II (RPO: L36). The SSEi remained equipped with the Series I SC 3800 (RPO: L67) engine until the 1996 model year, when it too was updated.

In March 2008, GM announced that these engines and other GM engines supplied with Dexcool antifreeze coolant might be prone to intake manifold failure and other problems with the cooling system if proper regular maintenance is not correctly performed. After settlement of a class-action lawsuit, GM agreed to compensate owners of many vehicles that suffered damage, regardless of negligence on the part of the consumer, if the consumer can prove damages.

1996–1999
 

In September 1995, styling changes were introduced for the 1996 model year facelift. Some things were subtly reshaped, and other things, such as the tail lights, headlights, grille, and lower body cladding were drastically changed. The gap narrowed quite a bit regarding the exterior trim between packages. The previous generation showed an entirely different style of cladding and rear lighting for the SSE and SSEi, while this generation, at first glance, remains the same between the trims, with of course, the exception of the unique front bumper and grille. Also for 1996, the supercharged version of the 3800 Series II engine was introduced for the Bonneville. This engine was used from 1995 until it was retired from the Bonneville in 2003.

According to GM, all L67 equipped SE's are just SE's. But, it also means that in order to have this engine, they needed to have the RPO H4U: Sport Luxury Edition (SLE). But since this was not a model, it had no badging in 1995 (and supposedly not for 1996 and 1997), it was just an option for the SE. Since the L67 was not part of the SLE option, ordering an SE with H4U would get you the mini console in the headliner, the cobra head shifter, performance/normal shift selection buttons, leather interior, chrome delete side and bumper moldings, center shift console, and touring suspension—but no supercharger. In order to get the supercharger in an SE, you needed to also pay for the SLE option. The SLE optioned SE was supposed to compete with European sedans in appearance and performance, whereas the SSEi was to be more of an American muscle sedan.

In 1997, the Bonneville returns virtually unchanged. The heavy-duty version of the 4T65E-HD was introduced for the supercharged 3800 installed in the SSEi models. Also in 1997, to mark the 40th year of production of the Bonneville, Pontiac made a 40th Anniversary Edition. There were six models produced: the SE, the 40th Anniversary SE, the SSE, the 40th Anniversary SSE, the SSEi, and the 40th Anniversary SSEi. The 40th anniversary models all had a VIN with Y40.  With a total production of 637 units, the  40th Anniversary SSEi is the rarest model.

For 1998, the Bonneville gets no major changes. However, a new transmission, the 4T65-E was introduced for the naturally aspirated 3800 installed in SE and SSE models. For 1999, the Bonneville essentially stood pat since an all-new model would arrive in 2000.

Engine availability
  L27 - SE (92-94), SLE (93-94), SSE (92-94)
  L36 - SE (95-99), SLE (95-99), SSE (95-99)
  L67 - SSE (92-93) optional, SSEi (92-93)
  L67 - SLE (95) optional, SSEi (94-95)
  L67 - SLE (96-97) optional, SSE (97) optional, SSEi (96-99)

Tenth generation (2000–2005) 

The 2000 Bonneville was restyled, using GM's G platform, which GM chose continued to call the H platform. GM's StabiliTrak stability control system was introduced on the top-of-the-line supercharged SSEi model, later replaced by the GXP.

Trim levels

The Bonneville was marketed in three time levels: SE, SLE and SSEi.  The SE came with a 3.8L V6 engine, 4-speed automatic transmission, air conditioning, cruise control, front bucket seats (a 55/45 split front bench was available on the SE only), 6-way power driver seat with lumbar adjustment, AM/FM stereo with CD player and 225/60/R16 tires.  The SLE added traction control, OnStar, leather-wrapped steering wheel, rear spoiler and 17-inch alloy wheels wrapped in 235/55/R17 tires.  The SSEi adds a 3.8L supercharged V6 engine, front-side air bags, leather upholstery, 12-way power driver seat and Monsoon AM/FM stereo with cassette and CD player.

For the last year of production, Pontiac gave the mid-level SLE the new GXP styling. The 2005 SLE featured all GXP styling cues, except the wheels, badging, muffler tips and engine all remained unique to the GXP.

Return of the V8
For 2004, the Bonneville regained a V8 option on the GXP trim. This was the first time since 1986 that a Bonneville had a V8 engine. As a result of the discontinuation of the Oldsmobile Aurora, this opened up a "hole" in the GM lineup between Pontiac and Buick, allowing Pontiac to expand upmarket somewhat. The engine is Cadillac's  Northstar V8, producing , . As Pontiac's website said, "With GXP, V8 power gets reintroduced into the Bonneville line in the form of the world-renowned 4.6 L (279 in³) Northstar V8 engine, giving  in 6.5 seconds demonstrates better performance than BMW 330i and 530i, and Lexus ES. Its 3.7:1 final drive ratio is the most aggressive found on any car in its class."

Safety
NHTSA crash tests for the 2005 Pontiac Bonneville resulted in a safety rating of 4-stars for the Driver and 5-stars for the Front Passenger.

Discontinuation 
GM announced on February 8, 2005, that the Bonneville would be dropped from Pontiac's lineup for 2006. The last Bonneville was assembled on May 27, 2005. About 12,000 Bonnevilles were sold in 2005. With more than half of Pontiac dealers also selling Buick models, the Buick Lucerne along with the Chevrolet Impala continued as GM's only mainstream full-size cars until the introduction of the 2008 G8.

References 

Coupés
Convertibles
Front-wheel-drive vehicles
Full-size vehicles
Mid-size cars
Police vehicles
Bonneville
Rear-wheel-drive vehicles
Sedans
1960s cars
1970s cars
1980s cars
1990s cars
2000s cars
Cars introduced in 1957
Motor vehicles manufactured in the United States